Britannia was launched in 1788 in Scotland and first appeared in Lloyd's Register (LR) in 1789 with D.Hunter, master, Hunter & Co., owners, and trade Greenock-Virginia. LR for 1794 showed her with D.Martin, master, Macneil & co., owners, and trade Greenock–New York. Britannia, of Glasgow, was under the command of Captain D. Martin when she wrecked on 8 February 1794 in the Wreck of the Ten Sail.

Citations

1788 ships
Age of Sail merchant ships of England
Maritime incidents in 1794